Brendan Smith may refer to:

Brendan Smith (politician) (born 1956), Irish Fianna Fáil politician, TD and government minister
Brendan Powell Smith (born 1973), American artist and author
Brendan Smith (cricketer) (born 1985), English cricketer
Brendan Smith (ice hockey) (born 1989), Canadian ice hockey defenceman
Brendan Smith (EastEnders), fictional character

Brendan J. Smith (born 1942), see List of taxonomic authorities named Smith

See also
Brandon Smith (disambiguation)
Brendan Smyth (1927–1997), Roman Catholic priest
Brendan Smyth (politician) (born 1959), Australian politician